Television in China may refer to:

 Television in the People's Republic of China, for Mainland China, also including the Hong Kong and Macau Special Administrative Regions
China Central Television
China Education Television
China Xinhua News Network Corporation
 Television in the Republic of China, for the country commonly known as Taiwan
Taiwan Television
China Television
Chinese Television System